Labo may refer to:

Places 

Labo, Camarines Norte, Philippines
Labo, Ozamiz, Philippines
Labo, Togo

People 

Ken "Labo" Labanowski (born 1959), American-Israeli basketball player

Other uses 

 Labo Phowa language (China)
 Labo Ninde language (Vanuatu)
 Nintendo Labo, a gaming and construction toy developed by Nintendo.